The Czech Social Democratic Party (ČSSD) leadership election of 2005 happened when incumbent Vladimír Špidla resigned as a result of party's poor performance in European Parliament election. Stanislav Gross and Zdeněk Škromach duelled in the election. Gross was front-runner and was endorsed by 12 regional organisations while Škromach was supported by only 1 region.

Gross defeated Škromach when he received votes of 291 delegates. 552 delegates were allowed to vote.

Voting

References

Czech Social Democratic Party leadership elections
Social Democratic Party leadership election
Social Democratic Party leadership election
Indirect elections
Czech Social Democratic Party leadership election
Czech Social Democratic Party leadership election